Adonis is an 1884 burlesque musical produced by Edward E. Rice who also composed the music along with John Eller. The book was written by William Gill.

After playing at Hooley's Opera House in Chicago in the summer of 1884, it debuted at the Bijou Theatre in New York on September 4, 1884. It there had a run of 603 consecutive performances, making it the longest-running show on Broadway during that period, and the longest Broadway run of all time until 1893. It was co-written and directed by Henry E. Dixey, who also starred as the titular Adonis. 

Adonis tells the story of a gorgeous male statue that comes to life and finds human ways so unpleasant that he chooses to turn back into stone – after spoofing several famous personalities.

The company traveled to London after the play closed in New York. 

After the show successfully ran for 500 shows, a cocktail, the Adonis, was named in its honor.

Character list and descriptions
The official program for the play described the characters as such:
Adonis, an accomplished young gentleman of undeniably good family, insomuch as he can trace his ancestry back through the Genozoic, Mesozoic, and Paleozoic period, until he finds it resting on the Archaean time. His family name, by the way, is ‘Marble’.
Marquis de Baccarat, a highly polished villain. It is well enough to describe his character, as no one would think it to look at him.
Bunion Turke, father of Rosetta, an unblushing appropriator of the stock in trade of a well-known and worthy old histrionic miller.
Talamea, a sculptor who, like most of her sex, is in love with her own creation.
Artea, a Goddess, Patroness of the fine arts.
Duchess of Area, aesthetic to the verge of eccentricity, rich to the verge of Millionairism, sentimental to the verge of gush.
Lady Nattie, daughter of the Duchess. She and her sisters Hattie, Mattie, and Pattie are professional beauties.
Lady Hattie, daughter of the Duchess. She and her sisters Nattie, Mattie, and Pattie are professional beauties.
Lady Mattie, daughter of the Duchess. She and her sisters Nattie, Hattie, and Pattie are professional beauties.
Lady Pattie, daughter of the Duchess. She and her sisters Nattie, Hattie, and Mattie are professional beauties.
Rosetta, a simple village maiden, the happy possessor of a clear conscience and a strong will.
Gyles, Nyles, Myles, & Byles, ordinary everyday rustics.
Gills, Bills, Sills, & Tills, homely rustics (who will perform a circus).
The Plumed Knights.

Original Broadway cast
Henry E. Dixey ... Adonis 
George W. Howard ... Bunion Turke (played as a Burlesque of C.W. Couldock's role of Dunstan Kirke in the very popular play Hazel Kirke)
Herbert Gresham ... Marquis
Ida Bell ... Lady Nattie
Lillie Grubb ... Talamea
Jennie Reiffarth ... Duchess
Louise Eissing ... Artea
Amelia Summerville ... Rosetta

References

History of the Musical Stage 1870s-1880s: Burlesques and Pantomimes
Image of original cast program

External links

1884 musicals
Broadway musicals